The 1932–33 Elitserien season was the sixth season of the Elitserien, the top level ice hockey league in Sweden. Eight teams participated in the league, and Hammarby IF unseated AIK as league champions.

Final standings

External links
 1932-33 season

Elitserien (1927–1935) seasons
1932–33 in Swedish ice hockey
Sweden